Maham Anga (died 1562) was the foster mother and chief wet nurse of the Mughal emperor Akbar. She was the political adviser of the teenage emperor and the de facto regent of the Mughal Empire from 1560 to 1562.

Biography
Maham Anga was Akbar's chief nurse prior to his enthronement at age of thirteen as Mughal emperor in 1556. Her own son, Adham Khan, as Akbar's foster brother, was almost regarded as one of the imperial family. Maham Anga, believed to be shrewd and ambitious, and very much in charge of the household and harem, sought to advance her own authority and that of her son. In 1560, the two tricked Akbar into coming to India without his regent and guardian Bairam Khan and were able to convince Akbar that now that he was seventeen, he did not need Bairam. Akbar dismissed his regent and sent him on a pilgrimage to Mecca. Months later, Bairam was murdered by an Afghan, and much of the former's power passed on to Maham Anga.

Death
Adham Khan's violent execution for the murder of Shams-ud-Din Ataga Khan, Akbar’s favourite general, at the hands of the young Emperor himself no less, in May 1562, profoundly affected her. She famously commented You have done well to Akbar when he broke the news to her and died shortly afterwards.

Her tomb and that of her son, known as Adham Khan's Tomb, was built by Akbar, and popularly named Bhul-bulaiyan, owing to the labyrinth in its structure, lies north of the Qutub Minar in Mehrauli.

Khairul Manazil
She also built a mosque, Khairul Manazil, in 1561 CE along the lines of Mughal architecture. It later served as a madarsa, and now stands opposite Purana Qila, Delhi on Mathura Road, south east to Sher Shah Gate.

It was her slave that tried to kill Akbar, after his return from hunting and moving towards Nizamuddin Dargah, but the arrow hit a soldier in his entourage instead, who was hurt, albeit not gravely.

In popular culture
Ila Arun portrayed Maham Anga in the Bollywood film Jodhaa Akbar (2008).
A fictionalized Maham Anga was portrayed by Ashwini Kalsekar in Zee TV's fictional drama Jodha Akbar.
Tiya Gandwani portrayed Maham Anga in BIG Magic's 2015 sitcom, Hazir Jawab Birbal.
Jaya Bhattacharya portrayed Maham Anga in Sony TV's historical drama Bharat Ka Veer Putra - Maharana Pratap.

References

Further reading
 Mughal Architecture of Delhi : A Study of Mosques and Tombs (1556-1627 A.D.), by Praduman K. Sharma, Sundeep, 2001, . Chapter 4.
 B.V. Bhavan 'The Mughal Empire' (Bombay 1974) The Cambridge History of India v.4 Abu'l Fazl 'Akbarnama' Badauni.

1562 deaths
Women in Delhi politics
Mughal nobility
Year of birth unknown
Akbar
16th-century Indian women politicians
Wet nurses